Eldred Point is an ice-covered point which marks the west side of the terminus of Land Glacier on the coast of Marie Byrd Land. It was mapped by the United States Geological Survey from surveys and U.S. Navy aerial photographs, 1959–65, and was named by the Advisory Committee on Antarctic Names for David T. Eldred, a member of the U.S. Navy winter-over support unit at McMurdo Station in 1958, 1965 and 1969.

See also 
Trenholm Point

References 

Headlands of Marie Byrd Land